Oldbury Athletic F.C. was a football club based in Oldbury, England. They were established in 1981. For the 2010–11 season, they were due to be playing in the West Midlands (Regional) League Premier Division, but resigned three weeks before the start of the season and folded.

Sources
 

Defunct football clubs in England
Association football clubs established in 1981
Oldbury, West Midlands
1981 establishments in England
Defunct football clubs in the West Midlands (county)
Association football clubs disestablished in 2010
West Midlands (Regional) League